Margaret McCarthy ( – death date unknown) was an Irish migrant to the United States.

On September 22, 1850, she wrote a letter to her family, as a guide for other emigrants. She explained that once in the United States, moving west was very expensive, though she did not know that those who did go rarely had an improved standard of living.

Her letter is typical of that of many immigrants, containing optimism about her own condition, and concern for the family and people she left behind.

Biography

She was born to Alexander "Sandy" McCarthy, a carpenter for the Crown Estate who lived in Boherboy, Ireland, and his wife, Neil.

McCarthy travelled from Kingwilliamstown in County Cork to Nohavaldaly, near Kanturk, during the Great Famine. She left from Liverpool, England, on September 7, 1849, on the Columbus, and arrived in New York City, United States, on October 22 of that year.

References

Letters (message)
1850 documents
English-language works
Works by Irish people
Works about immigration to the United States